Borislav Hazurov (born 4 October 1985) is a Bulgarian footballer who currently plays for Bansko as a striker.

Career
Hazurov previously played for Pirin Blagoevgrad, Litex Lovech, Marek Dupnitsa, Lokomotiv Mezdra and Bansko. He has been capped for the Bulgaria U21 national side.

Personal life
Borislav has a cousin who is also a football forward – Kostadin Hazurov.

References

External links
Profile at Soccerway

1985 births
Living people
Bulgarian footballers
First Professional Football League (Bulgaria) players
OFC Pirin Blagoevgrad players
PFC Litex Lovech players
PFC Marek Dupnitsa players
PFC Lokomotiv Mezdra players
FC Bansko players
OFC Bdin Vidin players
Atromitos Yeroskipou players
PFC Pirin Gotse Delchev players
FC Septemvri Simitli players
OFC Vihren Sandanski players
Association football forwards
Sportspeople from Blagoevgrad